Baby Girl may refer to:

 "Baby Girl" (Sugarland song), 2004
 "Baby Girl" (Jim Jones song), 2005
 Baby Girl (album), a 2007 album May J
 "Baby Girl", a song by Nelly Furtado from her 2000 album Whoa, Nelly!
 "Babygirl", a song by Meghan Trainor from her 2020 album Treat Myself
 Baby Girl, American rapper from female rap group HWA
 Babygirl, nickname for American singer and actress Aaliyah
 Baby Girl, nickname for the Criminal Minds character Penelope Garcia

See also
 "Baby Girl, I'm a Blur", a 2007 song by Say Anything